Mönkhbaataryn Bundmaa (born 4 September 1985) is a retired Mongolian judoka.
She won the silver medal in the half-lightweight category (52 kg) of the 2006 Asian Games, having lost to An Kum-Ae of North Korea in the final match. Recently she won Bronze in Judo senior world Championships 2010 Japan, Tokyo.

She was born in Uvurkhangai and currently resides in Ulaanbaatar.

References

External links
 

1985 births
Living people
Mongolian female judoka
Judoka at the 2008 Summer Olympics
Judoka at the 2012 Summer Olympics
Olympic judoka of Mongolia
Asian Games medalists in judo
Judoka at the 2002 Asian Games
Judoka at the 2006 Asian Games
Judoka at the 2010 Asian Games
Judoka at the 2014 Asian Games
Asian Games silver medalists for Mongolia
Medalists at the 2006 Asian Games
Medalists at the 2010 Asian Games
Universiade medalists in judo
Universiade gold medalists for Mongolia
Medalists at the 2007 Summer Universiade
21st-century Mongolian women